Ruth Kiew (born 1946) is a British botanist. Kiew was awarded the David Fairchild Medal of the National Tropical Botanical Garden in 2002.

Authority abbreviation

References

Living people
1946 births